6PPD is an organic chemical widely used as stabilising additive (or antidegradant) in rubbers, such as NR, SBR and BR; all of which are common in vehicle tires. Although it is an effective antioxidant it is primarily used because of its excellent antiozonant performance.  It is one of several antiozonants based around p-phenylenediamine (PPD).

Manufacturing
6PPD is prepared by reductive amination of methyl isobutyl ketone with 4-aminodiphenylamine. This produces a racemic mixture.

Application
6PPD is a common rubber antiozonant, with a major application in vehicle tires. It is mobile within the rubber and is slowly forced to the surface via blooming. Here it forms a "scavenger-protective film", reacting with the ozone more quickly that the ozone can react with the rubber. This process initially forms aminoxyl radicals and was thought to stop at the quinone diimine, but is now known to continue to form quinones, amongst other products. Despite 6PPD being used in tires since the mid 1960s, this transformation to quinones was first identified in 2020. These oxidised products are not effective antiozonants, meaning that 6PPD is a sacrificial agent.

The tendency of 6PPD to bloom towards the surface is beneficial for the item, as the surface film of antiozonant is replenished from reserves held within the rubber. However, this same property facilitates the transfere of 6PPD and its oxidation products into the environment as tire-wear compounds. The 6PPD-quinone (6PPD-Q, CAS:2754428-18-5) is of particular and increasing concern, due to its effect on fish.

Environmental impact
6PPD and 6PPD-quinone enter the environment through tire-wear and are sufficiently water-soluble to enter river systems via urban runoff. From here they become widely distributed (at decreasing levels) from urban rivers through to estuaries, coasts and finally deep-sea areas.

6PPD-quinone is of environmental concern, as it is toxic to coho salmon, killing them before they spawn in freshwater streams.

A 2022 study also identified the toxic impact on species like brook trout and rainbow trout.
The published lethal concentrations are:
 coho salmon: LC50 = 95 ng/L
 brook trout: LC50 = 0.59 μg/L
 rainbow trout: LC50 = 1.0 μg/L

It is not known why the ozone-oxidised 6PPD is toxic to coho salmon. The Nisqually and nonprofit Long Live the Kings are trying out a mobile stormwater filter at a bridge in the Ohop Valley. The Washington Department of Ecology, Washington State University and the US Tire Manufacturer's Association are working on regulation and education.

6PPD itself is deadly to rotifers, especially in combination with sodium chloride, though not at the level generally found in the runoff from road salt.
A small-scale biomonitoring study in South China has shown shown both 6PPD and 6PPDQ to be present in human urine; concentrations were low but the health implications are unknown.
A synthetic route to the 6PPD-quinone has been posted on ChemRxiv.

See also
 N-Isopropyl-N'-phenyl-1,4-phenylenediamine a related antiozonant
 N,''N'''-Di-2-butyl-1,4-phenylenediamine - a phenylenediamine based antioxidant used as a fuel additive

References 

Anilines
Antioxidants
Plastics additives
Water pollution